Livingbridge is a mid-market private equity firm launched in 1995. Headquartered in London, the firm also has offices in, Melbourne, Australia  and Boston, US.

Livingbridge was known until November 2014 as Isis Equity Partners, but rebranded as it was "no longer prepared to share [its name] with a terrorist organisation".

Since 1995 it has invested in over 100 UK businesses.

In 2016 it raised £660m in its eighth fundraise, its largest to date. In April 2016 Livingbridge announced the sale of Frank Recruitment Group to TPG Capital.

In 2017 Livingbridge won UK House of the Year at the 2017 Real Deals Private Equity Awards

References

External links

Financial services companies based in the City of London
Private equity firms of the United Kingdom